Dark-finger coral crab may refer to:

Atergatis subdentatus (de Haan, 1835), also known as the Red reef crab
Carpilius maculatus (Linnaeus, 1758), also known as the seven-eleven crab and spotted reef crab

Animal common name disambiguation pages